Eupithecia nonanticaria is a moth in the family Geometridae first described by Clifford D. Ferris in 2007. It is found in New Mexico (the Pinos Altos Range and the Black Range), Arizona (the Chiricahua Mountains) and Chihuahua in Mexico. The habitat consists of mixed coniferous forests at elevations above 1,760 meters.

The length of the forewings is 9.5–11 mm for males and 9–11 mm for females. The forewings are pale grayish white, with overlying darker scales. The basal and median areas of the hindwings are pale, but darker toward the margin. Adults are on wing from late July to mid August.

Etymology
The adjectival prefix non is added to the name Eupithecia anticaria to denote the similarity of the two species.

References

Moths described in 2007
nonanticaria
Moths of North America